The Upper Peninsula Conference(sometimes referred to as Upper Peninsula Intercollegiate Athletic Conference) was an intercollegiate athletic conference that existed from 1948-1958. As its name suggests, the league's members were located on the Upper Peninsula of Michigan and one team in northern Wisconsin. The conference held football as a sport for only the first two seasons, while basketball was competed throughout its duration. The conference also hosted events in golf, track & field and tennis.

Former members

Football champions
 1949 – Northern Michigan
 1950 – Northern Michigan

Basketball champions
 1948–49 – Northland
 1949–50 – Northern Michigan
 1950–51 – Northern Michigan
 1951–52 – Sault Saint Marie Tech
 1952–53 – Sault Saint Marie Tech
 1953–54 – Sault Saint Marie Tech
 1954–55 – Sault Saint Marie Tech
 1955–56 – Sault Saint Marie Tech
 1956–57 – Sault Saint Marie Tech
 1957–58 – Gogebic College

See also
 List of defunct college football conferences

References

Defunct college sports conferences in the United States
College sports in Michigan